Vicious Circle is the fourth album by the American hard rock band L.A. Guns. The first single was "Long Time Dead". The band supported the album with a North American tour.

Production
Michael "Bones" Gersema drums on several songs. "I'd Love to Change the World" is a cover of the Ten Years After song.

Critical reception

The Chicago Tribune stated that the band "hasn't wandered a bit from the glam metal they helped popularize in the late '80s—a raunchy sound that makes the true headbanger cringe," but conceded that the album "also features some danceable tunes." The Calgary Herald determined that "bow-taut guitar solos are slung against arrows of melody fired at the bulls-eye of '70s rock." The Tampa Tribune opined that "guitarist Tracii Guns' trigger-finger riffs still fire faster than a speeding bullet."

Track listing

Personnel
Phil Lewis – lead vocals except on "Nothing Better to Do", acoustic guitar
Tracii Guns – lead guitar, acoustic guitar, backing vocals
Mick Cripps – lead and rhythm guitar, piano, keyboards, bass on track 4, backing vocals
Kelly Nickels – bass guitar, lead vocals on "Nothing Better to Do", backing vocals

Additional musicians
Guy Griffin – acoustic guitar on track 15
Michael “Bones” Gersema – drums on tracks 1, 5, 9, 13, 14, 15, 16, and 17, backing vocals on tracks 1, 13 and 14
Myron Grombacher – drums on tracks 2, 10, 11, and 12
Nickey Alexander – drums on track 4
Steve Riley – drums on track 7
Doni Gray – drums on track 8 
Steve Councel – harmonica on track 8, 14 and 15, backing vocals on track 8 
Cliff Brodsky – piano on track 8
Steve Dior – backing vocals on track 2
Jim Wirt – backing vocals

Production
Jim Wirt – producer, engineer, mixing of tracks 6, 11 to 13
Michael James Jackson – producer and engineer on "Crystal Eyes"
Dan Daniel, Dennis Degher, Jeff Graham, Mark Shoffner, Marnie Riley, Tim Allison – assistant engineers
Mick Guzauski – mixing of tracks 1 to 5, 7 to 10, 14, 15
Stephen Marcussen – mastering
Robert Bisbo – album cover art

Charts

References

L.A. Guns albums
1994 albums
Polydor Records albums